A Stowaway on the Ship of Fools is a 2016 Serbian historical drama film directed by Goran Marković.

Plot
The story takes place in the Belgrade mental hospital on Guberevac during the WWI, where notable Serbian writer Petar Kočić spends his last years of life. The safety of mental hospital in a war-torn Belgrade is disrupted when the deputy military governor in occupied Belgrade Kosta Herman finds out that Kočić is in the hospital and decides to settle old scores with him.

Cast
Igor Đorđević as Petar Kočić
Aleksandar Đurica as Kosta Herman
Tihomir Stanić as Dr. Stojimirović
Maša Dakić as Elena
Radoje Čupić as Dr. Subotić
Jelena Đokić as Dr. Slavka
Andrijana Oliverić as Bošnjakovićka
Goran Šušljik as Burbon
Nemanja Oliverić as Bertold
Aleksandar Srećković as Arsa Lord
Srđan Timarov as Dušan Srezojević
Zinaida Dedakin as tetka Mara
Radovan Miljanić as Poslanik Dimitrijević
Miroljub Lešo as otac prota
Branko Jerinić as Tutunović
Jovan Jovanović as Jovan

Production
RTS joined the commemoration of 100 years of death of Petar Kočić.

The movie was released as a two-part TV movie and as a theatre release.

Igor Đorđević was awarded the best male role award at SOFEST.

References

External links
 

2016 films
Serbian historical drama films
2010s Serbian-language films
Films set in the 20th century
Films set in Belgrade
Films shot in Belgrade
Cultural depictions of Serbian men